Wang Jianjun (born June 1958) is a Chinese provincial politician who served as CPC Secretary of Qinghai Province from 2018 to 2022.

Career
Wang was born in Yun County (now Yunyang District of Shiyan City) in Hubei Province. He joined the Communist Party in March 1984. He holds a graduate degree from the Central Party School.

Wang is a career party functionary. He has served as the deputy head of the Qinghai Organization Department, the Director of Personnel of Qinghai, the head of the institutional reform office of Qinghai, and the secretary-general of the Qinghai Party Committee. In August 2005, he was admitted to the Qinghai Provincial Party Standing Committee. In January 2007 he was named party chief of the provincial capital Xining. In September 2010, he became deputy party chief of Qinghai. In 2011, he was named head of the provincial Zhengfawei (Political and Legal Affairs Commission). He was again named party chief of Xining following the corruption investigation of Mao Xiaobing; he served until May 2015. In December 2016, Wang was appointed as the Governor of Qinghai. He was appointed as the Party Secretary in March 2018. On April 20, 2022, he was made vice chairperson of the National People's Congress Social Development Affairs Committee.

Wang is an alternate member of the 18th Central Committee of the Chinese Communist Party, and a full member of the 19th Central Committee of the Chinese Communist Party.

References 

Politicians from Shiyan
1958 births
Living people
Governors of Qinghai
Chinese Communist Party politicians from Hubei
People's Republic of China politicians from Hubei
Alternate members of the 18th Central Committee of the Chinese Communist Party
Members of the 19th Central Committee of the Chinese Communist Party